William Hardell was a Mayor of London and a Magna Carta surety.

He was appointed Sheriff of the City of London in 1207 and elected Mayor of London (a century later known as Lord Mayor of London) in 1215.

After the sealing of Magna Carta by King John in 1215, he was appointed to be one of the Enforcers, sometimes called Sureties, of Magna Carta. The list of enforcers does not appear on Magna Carta itself and the first surviving list of these was by Matthew Paris the chronicler of St Albans.

References
 Oxford Dictionary of National Biography

12th-century births
13th-century deaths
13th-century mayors of London
Sheriffs of the City of London
Magna Carta barons
English feudal barons